Saint Maron (died 410) was a Syriac Christian hermit monk.

Maron may also refer to:

People
Maron (surname)

Fictional or mythological characters
 Maron (mythology), son of Evanthes
 Maron, a character in the Dragon Ball Z anime series
 Maron Kusakabe, in the manga series Phantom Thief Jeanne
 Cécile de Maron, in the German soap opera Verbotene Liebe

Places
 Mâron, Indre, France, a commune
 Maron, Meurthe-et-Moselle, France, a commune
 Máron, Crasna, Sălaj, Romania
 Maron Island, Manus Province, Papua New Guinea

Other uses
 Maron (TV series), an American comedy TV series

See also
 
 Marun (disambiguation)
 Maroun (name), a list of people with the given name or surname
 Marron (disambiguation)
 Maroon (disambiguation)